Aaron Tippin is an American country music artist. His discography comprises eleven studio albums. Of his studio albums, the highest-certified is 1992's Read Between the Lines, which is certified platinum by the RIAA and gold by the CRIA. Five more studio albums — You've Got to Stand for Something (1991), Call of the Wild (1993), Lookin' Back at Myself (1994), Tool Box (1995) and People Like Us (2000) — have been certified gold by the RIAA.

Tippin has released 38 singles, of which 34 have charted on Billboard Hot Country Songs. Three became Number One hits: "There Ain't Nothin' Wrong with the Radio" (1992), "That's as Close as I'll Get to Loving You" (1995), and "Kiss This" (2000). Four of his singles have also crossed over to the Billboard Hot 100, including the number 2 country hit "Where the Stars and Stripes and the Eagle Fly" from 2001, which peaked at number 20.

Studio albums

1990s

2000s and 2010s

Compilation albums

Holiday albums

Singles

1990s

2000s and 2010s

Other charted songs

Videography

Music videos

Notes

References

Tippin, Aaron
 
 
Tippin, Aaron